Saeed Ahmad Saeedi (چوہدری سعید احمد سعیدی) is a Pakistani politician who had been a member of the Provincial Assembly of the Punjab from August 2018 till January 2023. He was born in Toba Tek Singh, Punjab, Pakistan. He is the son of Chaudhry Shafi Ahmed and he belongs to Arain family.

Political career

Saeedi started his political career in the 2008 general election as a Pakistan Muslim League (Q) candidate from PP-90 Toba Tek Singh but lost to Mian Muhammaچوہدری سعید احمد سعیدی
d Rafique candidate of Pakistan Muslim League (N). He received 33,973 votes against 39,537 votes. In 2012 Saeedi quit Pakistan Muslim League (Q) and joined Pakistan Tareek-e-Insaf. In the general election 2013 he took part as a candidate of Pakistan Tareek-e-Insaf from PP-90 Toba Tek Singh and again lost to Mian Muhammad Rafique candidate of Pakistan Muslim League (N). He received 42,719 votes against 46,769 votes. In the 2018 general election 2018 he again took part as candidate of Pakistan Tareek-e-Insaf from PP-121 Toba Tek Singh and defeated Ch Amjad Ali Javaid candidate of Pakistan Muslim League(N).He got 61,716 votes against 56,345 votes.He became Parmilantery Sectectery of Excise and taxation in CM Usman Buzdar Cabinet  till 3rd April 2022.

References

Living people
Pakistan Tehreek-e-Insaf MPAs (Punjab)
Year of birth missing (living people)